is the 41st single by Hello! Project unit Morning Musume. The single was released on October 28, 2009 and was used as the ending theme for TV Tokyo's show, "The Gyakuryū Researchers". It was the last single featuring Morning Musume's seventh generation member Koharu Kusumi. The Single V DVD for "Kimagure Princess" was released on November 4, 2009. The music video for the single was recorded at La Foresta di Magnifica. This was released in four editions, limited A & B coming with DVDs, while limited C comes with 10 changeable covers (one for each member and one for the group) and a regular edition

Track listing

CD 
 
 
 "Kimagure Princess" (Instrumental)

Limited Edition A DVD 
 "Kimagure Princess (Dance Shot Ver.)" – 4:32

Limited Edition B DVD 
 "Kimagure Princess (Close-up Ver.)" – 4:30

Single V DVD 
 "Kimagure Princess"
 "Kimagure Princess (Green Dance Ver.)"

Event V 
 "Kimagure Princess (Ai Takahashi Solo Ver.)"
 "Kimagure Princess (Risa Niigaki Solo Ver.)" 
 "Kimagure Princess (Eri Kamei Solo Ver.)" 
 "Kimagure Princess (Sayumi Michishige Solo Ver.)" 
 "Kimagure Princess (Reina Tanaka Solo Ver.)" 
 "Kimagure Princess (Koharu Kusumi Solo Ver.)" 
 "Kimagure Princess (Aika Mitsui Solo Ver.)" 
 "Kimagure Princess (Junjun Solo Ver.)" 
 "Kimagure Princess (Linlin Solo Ver.)"

Featured lineup 
 5th generation: Ai Takahashi, Risa Niigaki
 6th generation: Eri Kamei, Sayumi Michishige, Reina Tanaka
 7th generation: Koharu Kusumi 
 8th generation: Aika Mitsui, Junjun, Linlin

Kimagure Princess Vocals

Main Voc: Ai Takahashi, Eri Kamei

Center Voc: Risa Niigaki, Reina Tanaka

Minor Voc: Sayumi Michishige, Koharu Kusumi, Aika Mitsui, Junjun, Linlin

Aishite Aishite Ato Ippun Vocals

Main Voc: Ai Takahashi, Risa Niigaki

Center Voc: Eri Kamei, Sayumi Michishige, Reina Tanaka

Minor Voc: Koharu Kusumi, Aika Mitsui, Junjun, Linlin

Chart positions

References

External links 
 Kimagure Princess official website (Flash) 
 "Kimagure Princess" entries on the Hello! Project official website: CD entry, DVD entry 

2009 singles
Morning Musume songs
Song recordings produced by Tsunku
Songs written by Tsunku
Zetima Records singles
Japanese-language songs
2009 songs
Dance-pop songs
Japanese synth-pop songs